Naxals or Naxalites are members of any of the Communist guerrilla groups in India.

Naxal or Naxalites may also refer to:

Media
The Naxalites, a 1980 Bollywood film
Naxal (film), a 2015 Tollywood film
 Naxalite, a 1997 single by English band Asian Dub Foundation commemorating the movement of the same name.

Other uses
Naxalbari is the name of a village in the northern part of West Bengal, India